Edward Ivill (7 December 1898 – 1979) was an English footballer who played in the Football League for Accrington Stanley, Charlton Athletic, Oldham Athletic and Wolverhampton Wanderers.

References

1898 births
1979 deaths
English footballers
Association football defenders
English Football League players
Bolton Wanderers F.C. players
Atherton F.C. players
Oldham Athletic A.F.C. players
Wolverhampton Wanderers F.C. players
Charlton Athletic F.C. players
Accrington Stanley F.C. (1891) players
Clitheroe F.C. players